Richland Township is one of fifteen townships in Greene County, Indiana, USA.  As of the 2010 census, its population was 5,019.

Geography
The streams of Beech Creek, Letsinger Branch, Miller Branch, Ore Branch, Plummer Creek, Ritter Branch, Skinner Branch, Stalcup Branch and Wildcat Branch run through this township. It is bounded by Township Road 400 to the north,  and the west fork of the White River to the west.

Cities and towns
 Bloomfield (the county seat)

Unincorporated towns
 Furnace
 Hashtown
 Mineral City
 Park
(This list is based on USGS data and may include former settlements.)

Adjacent townships
 Highland Township (north)
 Beech Creek Township (northeast)
 Center Township (east)
 Jackson Township (southeast)
 Taylor Township (south)
 Washington Township (southwest)
 Fairplay Township (west)
 Jefferson Township (northwest)

Cemeteries
The township contains four cemeteries: Flater, Mount Zion, Union Bethel, and Van Slyke.

Major highways

References
 U.S. Board on Geographic Names (GNIS)
 United States Census Bureau cartographic boundary files

External links
 Indiana Township Association
 United Township Association of Indiana
 Bloomfield Volunteer Fire Department
 Richland Township Volunteer Fire Department

Townships in Greene County, Indiana
Bloomington metropolitan area, Indiana
Townships in Indiana